Gavdaneh-ye Ludab (also Romanized as Gāvdāneh-ye Lūdāb; also known as Gāvdāneh) is a village in Ludab Rural District, Ludab District, Boyer-Ahmad County, Kohgiluyeh and Boyer-Ahmad Province, Iran. At the 2006 census, its population was 65, in 12 families.

References 

Populated places in Boyer-Ahmad County